The Tennessee Senate is the upper house of the U.S. state of Tennessee's state legislature, which is known formally as the Tennessee General Assembly.

The Tennessee Senate has the power to pass resolutions concerning essentially any issue regarding the state, country, or world. The Senate also has the power to create and enforce its own rules and qualifications for its members. The Senate shares these powers with the Tennessee House of Representatives. The Senate alone has the power to host impeachment proceeding and remove impeached members of office with a 2/3 majority. The Tennessee Senate, according to the state constitution of 1870, is composed of 33 members, one-third the size of the Tennessee House of Representatives. Senators are to be elected from districts of substantially equal population. According to the Tennessee constitution, a county is not to be joined to a portion of another county for purposes of creating a district; this provision has been overridden by the rulings of the Supreme Court of the United States in Baker v. Carr (369 U.S. 182, 1962) and Reynolds v. Sims (337 U.S. 356, 1964). The Tennessee constitution has been amended to allow that if these rulings are ever changed or reversed, a referendum may be held to allow the senate districts to be drawn on a basis other than substantially equal population.

Until 1966, Tennessee state senators served two-year terms. That year the system was changed, by constitutional amendment, to allow four-year terms. In that year, senators in even-numbered districts were elected to two-year terms and those in odd-numbered districts were elected to four-year terms. This created a staggered system in which only half of the senate is up for election at any one time. Senators from even-numbered districts are elected in the same years as presidential elections, and senators from odd-numbered districts are elected in the same years as mid-term elections. Districts are to be sequentially and consecutively numbered; the scheme basically runs from east to west and north to south.

Republicans attained an elected majority in the Senate in the 104th General Assembly (2005–07) for the first time since Reconstruction; a brief majority in the 1990s was the result of two outgoing senators switching parties. Following the 2018 elections, there were no Democratic senators from East Tennessee. There were three Democrats from Memphis in West Tennessee, and three from Middle Tennessee, two from Nashville and one from the Nashville suburb of Goodlettsville.

Senate Speaker
According to Article III, Section 12 of the Constitution of the State of Tennessee, the Speaker of the Senate assumes Office of Governor in the event of a Vacancy. The Senate elects one of its own members as Speaker and the Speaker automatically becomes Lieutenant Governor of Tennessee. The Speaker appoints a Speaker Pro Tempore who presides over the Senate in the absence of the Speaker as well as a Deputy speaker to assist the Speaker in his or her duties. The current Speaker of the Senate and Lieutenant Governor is Randy McNally, who was elected to the position in 2017. One of the main duties of the Speaker is to preside over the Senate and make Senate committee appointments based upon ability and preference of members, seniority, and party representation. The Speaker also maintains the power to remove members from Committee appointments. The Speaker, in cohort with the Speaker of the House of Representatives, chairs the Joint Legislative Services Committee which provides assistance to the General Assembly.  The Speaker also controls staffing and office space with Senate staff. The Speaker serves as an ex-officio member of all standing committees.

Oath and qualifications of office

Oath of office 
“I [name of official] do solemnly swear that, as a member of this, the [number, ex. One Hundred Eleventh] General Assembly of the State of Tennessee, I will faithfully support the Constitution of this State and of the United States, and I do solemnly affirm that as a member of this General Assembly, I will, in all appointments, vote without favor, affection, partiality, or prejudice; and that I will not propose or assent to any bill, vote or resolution, which shall appear to me injurious to the people, or consent to any act or thing, whatever, that shall have a tendency to lessen or abridge their rights and privileges, as declared by the Constitution of this state.”

Qualifications for office 
“No person shall be a senator unless he shall be a citizen of the United States, of the age of thirty years, and shall have resided three years in this state, and one year in the county or district, immediately preceding the election.”

Composition of the 113th General Assembly (2023-2025)

Senate Leadership and Members
Senate Leaders
Speaker of the Senate, Lieutenant Governor: Randy McNally
Speaker pro tempore: Ferrell Haile
Deputy Speaker: Shane Reeves, John Stevens, Dawn White

Members

Senate Committees 
The Tennessee State Senate has 12 committees in total: 9 standing committees and 3 select committees. Committee assignments for the 112th General Assembly were announced in the January 12, 2021 organizational session:

Past composition of the Senate 
In 1921, Anna Lee Keys Worley became the first woman to serve in the Tennessee Senate.

References

External links

Senate
State upper houses in the United States